Remme is a surname. Notable people with the surname include: 

Roni Remme (born 1996), Canadian skier
Stian Remme (born 1982), Norwegian cyclist

See also
Remmel
Remmer